The table below lists the judgments of the Constitutional Court of South Africa delivered in 2007.

The members of the court during 2007 were Chief Justice Pius Langa, Deputy Chief Justice Dikgang Moseneke, and judges Tholie Madala, Yvonne Mokgoro, Sandile Ngcobo, Bess Nkabinde, Kate O'Regan, Albie Sachs, Thembile Skweyiya, Johann van der Westhuizen, and Zak Yacoob.

References
 
 

2007
Constitutional Court
Constitutional Court of South Africa